Utharaswayamvaram is a 2009 Malayalam film by Remakanth Sarjju starring Jayasurya and Roma. M. Jayachandran did the music for this film.

Plot 

It starts with Prakashan, narrating his story to his friend Tony and Dr. Thomas Paul. He talks about his father, Sreedhara Kurup, who runs a supermarket. Sreedharan wants him to become an officer but Prakashan's interests lie elsewhere. After graduation, he is more interested in the activities of the village arts club than in looking for a job. He is in love with a village girl, Uthara alias Ponnu, who is his childhood friend. But her rich father, Mahadevan, arranges her marriage with another rich boy. The story builds up from here on.

Prakashan, who works as a driver in Ponnu's house, accompanies her to her friend's house. The car breaks down. They stay at a lodge, waiting for a mechanic. During this, Prakashan's friend Shaji who gets drunk gets upset about Ponnu not realising Prakashan's love, calls a policeman to raid the lodge and catch them, so that her marriage gets called off. This happens without Prakashan's knowing. When Sreedharan finds this he scolds Prakashan but he reveals the truth to everyone. His mother Sharadha believes him but his father refuses to believe it. On getting caught and later getting released, Ponnu faces backlash from her greedy relatives and Prakashan from his father. In anger, Ponnu decides that she will only marry Prakashan and not the ones her greedy relatives want her to. Mahadevan and grandmother support this.

Prakashan finally marries his dream-girl, but their marriage doesn't last even for a day, when the drunk Shaji accidentally says that he was the reason for the raid. A misunderstanding in his statement leads everyone to believe that Prakashan also knew about this. Prakashan tries to prove his innocence but his efforts prove to be in vain. Sreedharan ousts him out of his house without even listening to what he needs to tell him.

After a year, Prakashan is finally found in a faraway place in Madras. Sreedharan requests him to come back as Sharadha waits for him everyday with a lot of hope and says that he can't break his promise to her. But when they come back, Sharadha had already died of her illness. This leaves everyone devastated. Prakashan, after knowing that Ponnu is getting married, goes to her to bid a final farewell and reveals that he had only one problem that he couldn't prove his innocence to his mother and Ponnu. He gives her a bangle, bought with his hard-earned money as her wedding gift, and leaves.

Fast forward to 5 years later, Dr. Thomas suggests that Prakashan should meet Ponnu for old times sake, considering that he had saved her from an accident earlier in the day. In the hospital, he finds out that she had been discharged. Finally he reaches, only to find that Sreedharan and his sister Ambili had been the ones taking care of a depressed Ponnu. Sreedharan apologises to him for not believing him and for scolding him as he didn't know what has happened. He then explains that 5 years back, when he had left, Shaji, while explaining about Prakashan's innocence to Ponnu, got hit by a car and died instantly. After this traumatic experience, she stopped talking, moving and her wedding got called off. Mahadevan died of a broken heart after seeing her condition. Her greedy relatives put her in a mental asylum, from where Sreedharan found her and looked after her.

Finally, all ends well, with Uthara getting cured and starting a new life with Prakashan.

Cast 

 Jayasurya as Prakashan (Pachu)
 Roma Asrani as Uthara (Ponnu)
 Lalu Alex as Ponnuveettil Mahadevan
 Balachandra Menon as Sreedhara Kurup
 Varada as Ambili
 Shobha Mohan as Sharada Amma
 Lakshmipriya as 
 Sukumari as Mahadevan's mother
 Bijukuttan
 Janardhanan as Vasu
 Harisree Ashokan as Sarassappan
 Geetha Vijayan
 Indrans as Chellappan
 Sona Nair
 Narayanankutty
 Suraj Venjaramood as Pathalam Shaji
 Sai Kumar as Dr. Thomas Paul
 Sudheesh as Tony
 Appa Haja as Jayaraman

Soundtrack
"Mallike Mallike" - Chinmayi, Vijay Yesudas
"Amma Urangunnu" - Sudeep
"Bangalooru" - Franco Luambo

External links

References 

2009 films
2000s Malayalam-language films
Films scored by M. Jayachandran
Films shot in Chennai
Films shot in Bangalore
Films shot in Palakkad